is a Japanese manga series written and illustrated by Yūgo Ishikawa. It was serialized in Shogakukan's seinen manga magazine Big Comic Superior from April 2015 to October 2017.

Publication
Wonderland, written and illustrated by Yūgo Ishikawa, was serialized in Shogakukan's seinen manga magazine Big Comic Superior from April 24, 2015, to October 27 2017. Shogakukan collected its chapters in six tankōbon volumes, released from October 30, 2015, to November 30, 2017.

In North America, the manga was licensed for English release by Seven Seas Entertainment. The six volumes were released from November 20, 2018, to October 20, 2020.

Volume list

Reception
Wonderland was picked as a nominee for "Best Comic" at the 46th Angoulême International Comics Festival held in 2019. In 2020, Wonderland was one of the manga titles that ranked on the "Top 10 Graphic Novels for Teens" by the Young Adult Library Services Association (YALSA) of the American Library Association.

References

Further reading

External links
 

Comics based on Alice in Wonderland
Dark fantasy anime and manga
Seinen manga
Seven Seas Entertainment titles
Shogakukan manga
Supernatural anime and manga